Iliya Bekyarov (5 May 1938 - 12 August 2015) was a Bulgarian footballer who played as a defender. He is legendary player of Lokomotiv Plovdiv and have 314 appearances and 3 goals in A PFG for the club. He has played 20 games in the UEFA Cup for Lokomotiv Plovdiv.

Iliya Bekyarov is a vice-champion of Bulgaria for 1973, with one more bronze medal won - in 1969.

He has played in 2 games for the national team of Bulgaria in 1969.

References

1938 births
2015 deaths
Bulgarian footballers
Association football defenders
PFC Lokomotiv Plovdiv players
First Professional Football League (Bulgaria) players